A list of associated topics with Szabolcs-Szatmár-Bereg county in eastern Hungary. The list is far from complete.

A
Ajak | Anarcs | Apagy | Aranyosapáti |

B
Baktalórántháza | Balkány  | Balsa | Barabás | Bátorliget |  Benk | Beregdaróc |Beregsurány | Berkesz | Besenyőd | Beszterec |Biri | Botpalád | Bököny | Buj |

C
Cégénydányád | Csaholc | Csaroda | Császló | Csegöld | Csenger | Csengersima | Csengerújfalu |

D
Darnó | Demecser | Döge | Dombrád |

E
Economy of Szabolcs-Szatmár-Bereg | Encsencs | Eperjeske | Érpatak |

F
Fábiánháza | Fehérgyarmat | Fényeslitke |  Fülesd | Fülpösdaróc |

G
Gacsály | Garbolc | Gávavencsellő | Gelénes | Gemzse | Geszteréd | Géberjén | Gégény | Government of Szabolcs-Szatmár-Bereg | Gulács  | Győröcske | Győrtelek | Gyulaháza | Gyügye | Gyüre |

H
Hermánszeg | Hetefejércse | History of Szabolcs-Szatmár-Bereg | Hodász |

I
Ibrány | Ilk |

J
Jánd | Jánkmajtis | Jármi | Jéke |

K
Kállósemjén | Kálmánháza | Kántorjánosi | Kék | Kékcse | Kemecse | Kérsemjén | Kisar | Kishódos | Kisléta | Kisnamény | Kispalád | Kisszekeres | Kisvarsány | Kocsord | Komlódtótfalu | Komoró | Kótaj | Kölcse | Kömörő |

L
Laskod | Levelek | Lónya | Lövőpetri |

M
Magosliget | Magy | Mánd | Mándok | Márokpapi | Mátyus | Mezőladány | Méhtelek | Mérk | Milota |

N
Nagyar | Nagycserkesz | Nagydobos | Nagyhódos | Nagyszekeres | Nagyvarsány | Napkor | Nábrád | Nemesborzova | Nyírbéltek | Nyírbogát | Nyírbogdány | Nyírcsaholy | Nyírcsászári | Nyírderzs | Nyírgelse | Nyírgyulaj | Nyíribrony | Nyírjákó | Nyírkarász | Nyírkáta | Nyírkércs | Nyírlövő | Nyírmada | Nyírmeggyes | Nyírmihálydi | Nyírparasznya | Nyírpazony | Nyírpilis | Nyírtass | Nyírtét | Nyírtura | Nyírvasvári |

O
Olcsva | Olcsvaapáti | Ököritófülpös | Ömböly | Ópályi | Őr |

P
Panyola | Pap | Papos | Paszab | Pátroha | Pátyod | Penészlek | Penyige | Petneháza | Piricse | Porcsalma | Pócspetri | Pusztadobos |

R
Ramocsaháza | Rápolt | Rétközberencs | Rohod | Rozsály |

S
Sényő | Sonkád | Szabolcs | Szabolcsbáka | Szabolcsveresmart | Szakoly | Szamosangyalos | Szamosbecs | Szamoskér | Szamossályi | Szamosszeg | Szamostatárfalva | Szamosújlak | Székely | Szorgalmatos |

T
Tarpa | Tákos | Terem | Tiborszállás | Timár | Tisza | Tiszaadony | Tiszabercel | Tiszabecs | Tiszabezdéd | Tiszacsécse | Tiszadada | Tiszadob | Tiszaeszlár | Tiszakanyár | Tiszakerecseny | Tiszakóród | Tiszamogyorós | Tiszanagyfalu | Tiszarád | Tiszaszalka | Tiszaszentmárton | Tiszatelek | Tiszavid | Tisztaberek | Tivadar | Tornyospálca |Tunyogmatolcs | Tuzsér | Túristvándi | Túrricse |  Tyukod |

U
Újdombrád | Újkenéz | Ura | Uszka |

V
Vaja | Vállaj | Vámosatya | Vámosoroszi | Vasmegyer |

Z
Zajta | Zsarolyán | Zsurk

Kisvárda | Máriapócs | Mátészalka | Nagyhalász | Nagyecsed | Nagykálló |Nyírbátor | Nyírlugos | Nyírtelek | Rakamaz | Tiszalök | Tiszavasvári | Újfehértó | Vásárosnamény | Záhony

Indexes of topics by region
Szabolcs-Szatmár-Bereg County